Jean Guidoni (3 May 1952 in Toulon, Var) is a French singer and songwriter.

Music career
Jean Guidoni started recording in 1975, and in 1977, recorded his first album with a song written by Jacques Lanzmann. But he didn't feel fit in this repertoire. He found a daring author in Pierre Philippe, who wrote for him the album Je Marche Dans les Villes ("I walk in the cities") released in 1980. The major themes were homosexuality and BDSM, and the album was awarded the prestigious Grand Prix du Disque for French Song by the Académie Charles Cros in 1981.

The Argentine tango composer Astor Piazzolla composed the music for the next album, still with lyrics by Pierre Philippe, Crime Passionnel. His 1985 album Putains ("Whores") was considered "scandalous".

In 1987, he wrote the lyrics of his album Tigre de Porcelaine, which received one more award from the Académie Charles Cros. In a series of shows, he performed in drag.

In 1995, the famous film-composer Michel Legrand composed the music for his album Vertigo, containing a song about dealing with AIDS, N'Oublie Jamais Qui Tu Es. Juliette Noureddine, who formerly worked with Pierre Philippe, participated in the writing of the 1999 show Fin de Siècle.

His next album was only released in 2004, with lyrics by writers Marie Nimier and Jean Rouaud, on music by new Francophone singers such as Daniel Lavoie and Édith Fambuena. La Pointe Rouge saw the participation of Dominique A, Philippe Katerine and Jeanne Cherhal, among others.

In 2008, he paid homage to French poet Jacques Prévert with an album of his songs, two of which on a music by Thierry Escaich.

Personal life 
Jean Guidoni never hid his homosexuality, and chose to perform many songs with LGBT-related themes.

Discography
 Guidoni 77 (1977)
 Guidoni 78 (1978)
 Je marche dans les villes (1980)
 Crime passionnel (1982)
 Le Rouge et le Rose (1983)
 Putains (1985)
 Tigre de porcelaine (1987)
 Aux tourniquets des grands cafés (1990)
 Cas particuliers (1993)
 Vertigo (1995)
 Trapèze (2004)
 La Pointe rouge (2007)
 Chante Prévert - Étranges étrangers (2008)
 Paris - Milan (2014)
 Légendes urbaines (2017)

Live albums
 Chromos (1986)
 Jean Guidoni à L'Olympia (1988)
 Concert 1989 Fin de siècle 1 & 2 (1999-2000)Crime passionnel (2001)

Best of
 Fenêtre sur cœur (1997)
 Long Box (2003)
 Scènes de vie'' (2004)

Related Francophone Artists
Astor Piazzolla
Michel Legrand
Juliette Noureddine
Daniel Lavoie
Édith Fambuena

References

1952 births
Living people
Musicians from Toulon
French male songwriters
French gay musicians
French LGBT singers
French LGBT songwriters
Gay singers
Gay songwriters
20th-century French male singers
21st-century French male singers
20th-century French LGBT people
21st-century French LGBT people